Death in Gaza is a 2004 documentary film about the Israeli–Palestinian conflict, opening in the West Bank but then moving to Gaza and eventually settling in Rafah where the film spends most of its time. It concentrates on 3 children, Ahmed (age 12), Mohammed (age 12) and Najla (age 16).

Topics

Children
The film follows the children in different aspects of their lives including life in the vicinity of military forces and games born out of the conflict – such as running towards, throwing rocks and homemade explosives, quwas, at armored vehicles; Study materials in schools which focus on Palestinian perceptions of the conflict, as well as time spent with family and friends, including following one of the children as he plays with and helps militant fighters. The film also makes note of the political use of public mourning for conflict enhancement.

Martyrdom
For a short while the film concentrates on martyrdom and the opinions of the people there about dying for Palestine and Islam. It briefly tells the story of a young boy who was shot while attacking Israeli forces much like the main boys Ahmed and Mohammed, as well as numerous other unnamed boys. The film follows the boy from being brought into the medical center and the initial treatment, to his death and public reaction, to the parade and his burial, and celebration at his success in becoming a martyr.

James Miller's death
While filming, producer/director James Miller was killed by an Israeli soldier. His death was incorporated as a major part of the film, with an explanation by the narrator, Saira Shah, at the beginning of the film, and the full story and reactions at the end. It is mentioned that, against the film crew's wishes, Palestinian people made posters declaring that Miller was a martyr.

See also
 Gaza Strip (film)

References

External links
 
 Channel 4 Films Death in Gaza page
 Death in Gaza page from HBO.

2004 films
2004 documentary films
British documentary films
Films set in the Gaza Strip
Documentary films about the Israeli–Palestinian conflict
2000s British films